Symphyogyna is a genus in the liverworts in the family Pallaviciniaceae. Approximately 123 species are recognized. Although World Flora Online only acceptes 46 species.

It is mainly found on Central and South America.

Species
The Global Biodiversity Information Facility accepts 54 species:

 Symphyogyna apiculispina 
 Symphyogyna aspera 
 Symphyogyna atronervia 
 Symphyogyna bogotensis 
 Symphyogyna boliviensis 
 Symphyogyna brasiliensis 
 Symphyogyna brevicaulis 
 Symphyogyna brongniartii 
 Symphyogyna chiloensis 
 Symphyogyna circinata 
 Symphyogyna crassicosta 
 Symphyogyna digitisquama 
 Symphyogyna fuscovirens 
 Symphyogyna goebelii 
 Symphyogyna grandibracteata 
 Symphyogyna harveyana 
 Symphyogyna hochstetteri 
 Symphyogyna hymenophyllum 
 Symphyogyna ignambiensis 
 Symphyogyna interrupta 
 Symphyogyna irregularis 
 Symphyogyna lacerosquama 
 Symphyogyna leptothelia 
 Symphyogyna lindmanii 
 Symphyogyna luetzelburgii 
 Symphyogyna marginata 
 Symphyogyna mexicana 
 Symphyogyna multiflora 
 Symphyogyna paucidens 
 Symphyogyna podophylla 
 Symphyogyna purpureolimbata 
 Symphyogyna rectidens 
 Symphyogyna rhizobola 
 Symphyogyna rhodina 
 Symphyogyna rubescens 
 Symphyogyna rubritincta 
 Symphyogyna schweinitzii 
 Symphyogyna semi-involucrata 
 Symphyogyna serrata 
 Symphyogyna similis 
 Symphyogyna sinensis 
 Symphyogyna sinuata 
 Symphyogyna subsimplex 
 Symphyogyna tenuinervis 
 Symphyogyna trivittata 
 Symphyogyna ulvoides 
 Symphyogyna undulata 
 Symphyogyna volkensii

References

Other sources
 Evans, A.W. (1925), The lobate species of Symphyogyna. Transactions of the Connecticut Academy of Arts and Science 27: 1–50.
 Uribe, J. & Aguirre, J. (1995), Las especies colombianas del género Symphyogyna (Hepaticae: Pallaviciniaceae). Caldasia 17 (82–85): 429–458.

Pallaviciniales
Liverwort genera